Sophie of Württemberg (20 November 1563 - 21 July 1590), was a German noblewoman member of the House of Württemberg and by marriage Duchess of Saxe-Weimar.

Born in Stuttgart, she was the youngest of twelve children born from the marriage of Christoph, Duke of Württemberg and Anna Maria of Brandenburg-Ansbach. From her eleven older siblings, nine survive adulthood: Eberhard, Hereditary Prince of Württemberg, Hedwig (by marriage Landgravine of Hesse-Marburg), Elisabeth (by her two marriages Countess of Henneberg-Schleusingen and Countess Palatine of Veldenz-Lauterecken), Sabine (by marriage Landgravine of Hesse-Kassel), Emilie (by marriage Countess Palatine of Simmern-Sponheim), Eleonore (by her two marriages Princess of Anhalt and Landgravine of Hesse-Darmstadt), Louis III, Duke of Württemberg, Dorothea Maria (by marriage Countess Palatine of Sulzbach) and Anna (by her two marriages Duchess of Oława and Legnica).

Life
In Weimar on 5 May 1583 Sophie married Frederick William I, Duke of Saxe-Weimar. They had six children, of whom only two survive adulthood:
Dorothea Marie (Weimar, 8 May 1584 – Weimar, 9 September 1586).
John William, Hereditary Prince of Saxe-Weimar (Weimar, 30 June 1585 – Weimar, 23 January 1587).
Frederick (Weimar, 26 September 1586 – Weimar, 19 January 1587).
Dorothea Sophia (Weimar, 19 December 1587 – Weimar, 10 February 1645), Princess-Abbess of Quedlinburg (1618).
Anna Marie (Weimar, 31 March 1589 – Dresden, 15 December 1626).
stillborn son (Vacha, 21 July 1590).

Sophie died in Vacha aged 26, following complications of her last childbirth. She was buried in the Stadtkirche St.Peter und Paul, Weimar.

References

|-

House of Württemberg
House of Wettin
1563 births
1590 deaths
Deaths in childbirth
Daughters of monarchs